Ardeadoris is a genus of sea slugs, specifically dorid nudibranchs, shell-less marine gastropod mollusks in the family Chromodorididae.

Species 
This genus includes the following species:
 Ardeadoris angustolutea (Rudman, 1990)
 Ardeadoris averni (Rudman, 1985)
 Ardeadoris carlsoni (Rudman, 1986)
 Ardeadoris cruenta (Rudman, 1986)
 Ardeadoris egretta  Rudman, 1984 
 Ardeadoris electra (Rudman, 1990)
 Ardeadoris poliahu (Bertsch & Gosliner, 1989)
 Ardeadoris pullata (Rudman, 1995)
 Ardeadoris rubroannulata (Rudman, 1986)
 Ardeadoris scottjohnsoni  Bertsch & Gosliner, 1989 
 Ardeadoris symmetrica (Rudman, 1990)
 Ardeadoris tomsmithi (Bertsch & Gosliner, 1989)
 Ardeadoris undaurum (Rudman, 1985)

References

Chromodorididae